On 4 May 2000 at 12:21 WITA (04:21 UTC), Banggai Islands Regency was hit by an earthquake of magnitude 7.5 , followed by a tsunami. The Banggai Islands, an archipelago located at the far eastern end of Central Sulawesi, Indonesia, was the worst affected by the earthquake. Eighty percent of Banggai's buildings were destroyed. Damage also occurred on Peleng. The earthquake triggered a local tsunami of up to 6 m in height that caused significant damage east of Luwuk on the mainland and on Peleng.

Tectonic setting 
The Banggai region of Sulawesi lies within the complex area of interaction between the Pacific, Philippine Sea, Australian and Eurasian Plates. The Banggai Islands themselves form part of the Banggai-Sula microcontinent, which collided with eastern Sulawesi during the Neogene, with a thrust fault boundary along the southeastern edge of the Eastern arm. The northern margin of the Banggai-Sula block has been interpreted as a continuous southward moving thrust zone, but seismic reflection data and high-resolution multibeam bathymetry show little sign of thrusting, with evidence instead of a zone of dextral strike-slip faulting.

Earthquake 
The earthquake had an initial estimated magnitude of 7.6 , 7.5 , 6.7  and a recalculated magnitude of 7.5 . The focal mechanism is consistent with strike-slip faulting on either a NW-SE trending sinistral (left-lateral) fault or a SW-NE trending dextral (right-lateral) fault. An analysis of seismic waveforms suggest that the SW-NE trending fault fits the data best. The observed source time function gives a 30 second duration for the earthquake.

The mainshock was followed by a series of aftershocks, the largest of which occurred just over 24 hours later and had magnitude of 5.7 .

The strong earthquake jolted the province's Banggai Island.

Tsunami 
A tsunami was formed after the earthquake in Indonesia's central province, Sulawesi. Indonesia meteorological agency (BMKG) reported that the quake triggered a five meter high tsunami that struck the eastern coast of Banggai and other smaller islands around it. Several small islands were also reported to have been completely submerged.

Damage and casualties 
Because of the remoteness of the area and the destruction of roads, it was difficult to assess the damage, but it is estimated that 10,500 families lost their homes, of which 3,500 were in Banggai district. According to official figures released by the Banggai regional government on 19 May, 45 people were killed and 270 injured, 54 of them seriously. According to United Nations Office for the Coordination of Humanitarian Affairs (UNOCHA), the overall damage to private and public buildings and infrastructure in the affected areas was as follows.

The tsunami completely inundated several villages, destroying all the houses. The rescue team identified the following families as homeless on the islands of Banggai and Peleng.

Response

National
Government action

The Indonesian government has distributed 30 tons of rice, 300 kilograms of sugar, milk powder and instant noodles on the Banggai Islands. According to the Indonesia government, medical supplies are available to support for at least six months.

The Indonesian Government provided

1, Volunteers to assist the rescue plan

2, Two navy ships serve as a hospital and as well for delivering supplies.

3, A geological group that provides accurate information about the statistics of the earthquake.

4, two medical teams

Indonesian Red Cross (PMI)/ Federation action

Five Mt. of the rice was released by the Indonesian Red Cross (PMI) from its inventory with the national government logistics agency.
The medicines donated to PMI by the Singapore Red Cross are divided into sections for health stations that provide free medical services to the population. The criteria for the selection of health posts are determined by the PMI, based on the most pressing needs of each post. Donated and distributed medicines include:

1, Amoxicillin 250 mg: 5,000 tablets

2, Amoxicillin granules: 200 bottles

3, Cimetidine: 1,500 tablets

4, Cotrimoxazole adult: 8,000 tablets

5, CTM: 10,000 tablets

6, Multivitamin syrup: 500 bottles

7, Dextromethorphan: 500 bottles

8, Paracetamol 500 mg: 10,000 tablets

9, Ferrous sulfate: 15,000 tablets

10, Hydrocortisone cream: 50 tubes

The Ministry of Housing and Regional Development Action

The Ministry of Housing and Regional Development decided to assist the Banggai Islands by allocating 16 billion Indonesian rupiah (US$2.2 million) for the repair of housing and transport infrastructure.

International
The Government of Japan sent a speed boat to provide emergency transport.

See also 
 1968 Sulawesi earthquake
 2018 Sulawesi earthquake and tsunami
 List of earthquakes in Indonesia

References

External links

2000 in Indonesia
Banggai Islands Regency
2000 earthquakes
Earthquakes in Indonesia
May 2000 events in Asia
2000 tsunamis
Tsunamis in Indonesia
2000 disasters in Indonesia